Jeremy Terrell Clark (born September 6, 1983) is a former American football defensive end. He was signed by the Philadelphia Eagles as an undrafted free agent in 2007. He played college football at the Alabama.

Clark has also been a member of the New York Giants, Atlanta Falcons, Arizona Cardinals, Dallas Cowboys and Washington Redskins.

College career
Clark was a  four-year starter at Alabama, Clark registered 85 tackles, 4.5 sacks, and 8 TFLs during his collegiate career.

Professional career

Philadelphia Eagles
Clark signed with the Philadelphia Eagles as an undrafted free agent following the 2007 NFL Draft on April 30, 2007. He was waived during final cuts on September 1, but was re-signed to the team's practice squad on September 3. He spent the entire 2007 season on the Eagles' practice squad. He was re-signed to a three-year contract on January 2, 2008. He was waived on June 13 before the start of training camp.

First stint with Giants
Clark signed with the New York Giants on July 27, 2008. He was waived during final cuts on August 30, but was re-signed to the team's practice squad on August 31. He was promoted to the active roster on November 29. He played in four games in 2008, recording four tackles.

He was waived/injured on September 5, 2009 and subsequently reverted to injured reserve. He was released with an injury settlement on September 8.

Atlanta Falcons
Clark was signed to the Atlanta Falcons' practice squad on September 22, 2009. He was released on December 1.

Second stint with Giants
Clark was re-signed to the Giants' practice squad on December 4, 2009, where he remained through the end of the regular season.

Arizona Cardinals
Clark was signed by the Arizona Cardinals on January 5, 2010 after defensive end Jason Banks was placed on injured reserve. He was re-signed to a one-year contract on March 10. He was waived during final cuts following training camp on September 3.

Dallas Cowboys
Clark was signed by the Dallas Cowboys on November 10, 2010, after Marcus Spears and Akwasi Owusu-Ansah were placed on injured reserve. He was released on December 8.

Washington Redskins
Clark was signed by the Washington Redskins on December 16, 2010. He was waived on December 25.

Second stint with Eagles
Clark was signed to a three-year contract by the Philadelphia Eagles on December 30, 2010, after Jeff Owens was placed on injured reserve. He was released on July 28, 2011.

References

External links

Philadelphia Eagles bio
Dallas Cowboys bio
Arizona Cardinals bio
New York Giants bio

1983 births
Living people
People from Daphne, Alabama
Players of American football from Alabama
American football defensive tackles
American football defensive ends
Alabama Crimson Tide football players
Philadelphia Eagles players
New York Giants players
Atlanta Falcons players
Arizona Cardinals players
Dallas Cowboys players
Washington Redskins players